Tareloppa is an islet 2 miles (3 km) northeast of Brækmoholmane, part of Thousand Islands, an archipelago south of Edgeøya.

References 

 Norwegian Polar Institute Place Names of Svalbard Database

Islands of Svalbard